Myosin light chain 5 is a protein that, in humans, is encoded by the MYL5 gene.

Function

This gene encodes one of the myosin light chains, a component of the hexameric ATPase cellular motor protein myosin. Myosin is composed of two heavy chains, two nonphosphorylatable alkali light chains, and two phosphorylatable regulatory light chains. This gene product, one of the regulatory light chains, is expressed in fetal muscle and in adult retina, cerebellum, and basal ganglia.

References

Further reading